NGC 1444 is a small open cluster of stars in the northern constellation of Perseus, about 2-° to the northwest of 43 Persei. The cluster has sixty members of seventh magnitude or fainter, and is better appreciated in larger telescopes. NGC 1444 was discovered on 18 December 1788 by the German-British astronomer William Herschel. The most prominent member is the triple star system Σ446, with a magnitude 6.7 primary. The cluster is a member of the Camelopardalis OB1 association.

References 

Open clusters
1444
Perseus (constellation)